James Elwyn Marquand (born 21 September 1964) is a British film editor and director. He was born in Hammersmith, west London, the son of Welsh director Richard Marquand (Jagged Edge, Return of the Jedi), and his first wife Josephine Elwyn-Jones, an English screenwriter. His paternal uncle David Marquand, paternal grandfather Hilary Marquand, and maternal grandfather Elwyn Jones were all Welsh Labour Party MPs, and his maternal grandmother Pearl Binder, who was of Russian-Jewish and Ukrainian-Jewish descent, was an author and illustrator . As a child, much of his time was spent on film sets observing his father. Later, he was an editor on his father's final film Hearts of Fire. His first short film, The Lesson (1998), was nominated for a BAFTA Kodak Award . He moved on to feature films when he wrote, directed, and produced his first film, Dead Man's Cards (2006).

Filmography 
Marquand worked on the following films:

See also
Richard Marquand (father)
David Marquand (uncle)
Hilary Marquand (grandfather)
Elwyn Jones, Baron Elwyn-Jones (grandfather)
Pearl Binder (grandmother)

References

External links
 
 Liverpool Daily Post, February 28, 2008.
 James Marquand on Facebook

1964 births
English film directors
English film editors
English people of Russian-Jewish descent
English people of Ukrainian-Jewish descent
English people of Welsh descent
Film directors from London
Living people
People from Hammersmith